Olga García Pérez (born 1 June 1992) is a Spanish footballer who plays as a forward for Primera División club EdF Logroño and the Spain women's national team.

Career

Club
As a young girl, Olga played for clubs La Penya Blac i Brava La Roca and FC Mataró before arriving at the youth teams of FC Barcelona in 2004 when she was about 12 years old. She was promoted to the club's first team at the 2010–11 season and at her first season she became the club's top scorer with 25 goals, including the winning goal of the 2011 Copa de la Reina de Fútbol final. On her second season (2011–2012), she was the club's second top goalscorer with 22 goals, winning the Primera División. On the 2012–2013 season she was again the club's second top scorer with 13 league goals, playing with the club at the 2013 Champions League and winning the Copa de la Reina and the Primera División.

In June 2013 she signed a two-year contract with Levante UD.

She moved back to FC Barcelona after two seasons at Levante, signing a contract with the club in July 2015.

International
Garcia played for Spain on the under-17 and under-19 team. She was part of team which competed at the 2011 UEFA Women's Under-19 Championship.

She trained and has been involved with the senior national team since the 2012–2013 season. Her match debut happened on 26 November 2015, coming on as a substitute during Spain's UEFA Women's Euro 2017 qualifying 3–0 win against Republic of Ireland in Dublin. At the end of that match, she had a shot deflected off Sophie Perry which resulted on Spain's third goal.

International goals

Honours
Barcelona
 Primera División: Winner 2011–12, 2012–13
 Copa de la Reina: Winner 2011, 2013, 2017, 2018
 Copa Catalunya: Winner 2011, 2012, 2015, 2016, 2017

Spain
 Algarve Cup: Winner 2017
 Cyprus Cup: Winner 2018

References

External links
 
 Profile at FC Barcelona 
 Olga García, BDFutbol

Spanish women's footballers
1992 births
Living people
Primera División (women) players
Levante UD Femenino players
FC Barcelona Femení players
Women's association football forwards
Atlético Madrid Femenino players
Spain women's international footballers
Footballers from Catalonia
People from Maresme
Sportspeople from the Province of Barcelona
Sportswomen from Catalonia
EdF Logroño players
UEFA Women's Euro 2017 players
Primera Federación (women) players
Segunda Federación (women) players
21st-century Spanish women